Ruslan Musayev (born 11 May 1979) is a retired Azerbaijani football player who played for the Azerbaijan national team.

National team statistics

References

1979 births
Living people
Azerbaijani footballers
Azerbaijan international footballers
Azerbaijani expatriate footballers
Expatriate footballers in Estonia
Azerbaijan Premier League players
Meistriliiga players
Association football midfielders
FC Akhmat Grozny players
JK Tervis Pärnu players
FK Genclerbirliyi Sumqayit players
Azerbaijani expatriate sportspeople in Estonia